Ionuț Cristian Stancu (born 17 January 1983) is a Romanian former football wingback. Stancu started his career at Universitatea Craiova in 2001, featuring in the first team on occasion, before moving to Rapid București in 2004. His first match in Liga I was on 14 March 2001 while playing for Universitatea Craiova against Petrolul Ploieşti.

Honours
Rapid București
 Cupa României: 2005–06, 2006–07
 Supercupa României: 2007

CS Universitatea Craiova
 Liga II: 2013–14

External links
 
 

1983 births
Living people
Sportspeople from Craiova
Romanian footballers
Association football defenders
Association football central defenders
Association football wingers
Liga I players
FC U Craiova 1948 players
AFC Rocar București players
FC Rapid București players
FC Politehnica Iași (1945) players
CS Pandurii Târgu Jiu players
FC Olt Slatina players
SCM Râmnicu Vâlcea players
CS Mioveni players
CS Universitatea Craiova players